The 2015 Supercopa de Chile was the third edition of this championship organised by the ANFP.

The match was played between the 2014-15 Primera División Best-Champions Universidad de Chile, and the 2014–15 Copa Chile Winners Universidad de Concepción.

Road to the final

The two teams that contested the Supercopa were Universidad de Chile, that qualified as 
Apertura 2014 Champion and the Best Champion in the accumulated table, and Universidad de Concepción, that qualified for the match as the winner of the 2014–15 Copa Chile, defeating Palestino 3:2 at the Estadio Fiscal de Talca.

Details

Champion

References

Club Universidad de Chile matches
Chil
Copa Chile